The Hong Kong women's national beach handball team is the national team of Hong Kong. It takes part in international beach handball competitions.

World Championships results
2004 – 8th place

References

External links
Official website
IHF profile

Women's national beach handball teams
Women's national sports teams of Hong Kong